Mohamad Al-Garni (born 2 July 1992) is a Moroccan-born Qatari middle-distance runner. He competed in the 1500 metres competition at the 2012 Summer Olympics.

In 2016 he refused to submit to a doping test, and was subsequently banned from competition for four years between 15 June 2016 and 3 July 2020.

International competitions

References

External links
 
 
 

1992 births
Living people
Qatari male middle-distance runners
Moroccan male middle-distance runners
Olympic athletes of Qatar
Athletes (track and field) at the 2012 Summer Olympics
Athletes (track and field) at the 2016 Summer Olympics
Moroccan emigrants to Qatar
Qatari people of Moroccan descent
Asian Games gold medalists for Qatar
Asian Games medalists in athletics (track and field)
Athletes (track and field) at the 2014 Asian Games
Doping cases in athletics
Qatari sportspeople in doping cases
Medalists at the 2014 Asian Games